Girardinichthys ireneae is a species of fish from the family Goodeidae which is endemic to Laguna de Zacapu in Michoacán state of Mexico. Some authorities consider that this taxon is synonymous with Hubbsina turneri. The specific name honours Mrs Irene Radda of Vienna.

References

ireneae
Taxa named by Alfred C. Radda
Taxa named by Manfred K. Meyer
Fish described in 2003